The Soo Line Depot is located in New Richmond, Wisconsin.

History
The depot was originally built for Wisconsin Central Railway, which would eventually merge with Soo Line Railroad. It was built to replace a previous depot, which despite having survived a major tornado in 1899, would later be destroyed in a fire. This depot was designed to be fireproof.

Passenger train service to the New Richmond station ended on January 15, 1965, when the Soo Line Laker between Chicago and the Twin Cities was discontinued. 

In 1988, the depot was added to the National Register of Historic Places. The following year, it was listed on the State Register of Historic Places.

See also
 Soo Line Depot, a listing of other Soo Line Depots

References

Railway stations on the National Register of Historic Places in Wisconsin
National Register of Historic Places in St. Croix County, Wisconsin
Former Soo Line stations
Vernacular architecture in Wisconsin
Stone buildings in the United States
Railway stations in the United States opened in 1915
Railway stations closed in 1965
Former railway stations in Wisconsin